William Stanger (born 19 September 1985) is a French former professional footballer who played as a midfielder.

Career 
Stanger joined Rangers in May 2006. He was signed by fellow countryman Paul Le Guen from Stade Rennais FC, along with Rennes youth team-mate Antoine Ponroy.

On 22 January 2007, he joined Swedish side GAIS for a week-long trial, but was not signed. He left Rangers by mutual consent on 8 February 2007, as he was not considered to feature in new manager Walter Smith's future plans. He played only one game for the squad during his time with the Rangers, on 14 December 2006 in a 2006–07 UEFA Cup game against FK Partizan.

He signed for PSG in October 2007, in August 2008 leave Paris and moved to AFC Compiègne. After two years with AFC Compiègne signed in summer 2010 with Vendée Poiré-sur-Vie.

In 2013, he joined ESOF Vendee La Roche sur Yon in CFA2.

References and notes

External links
 

Living people
1985 births
Sportspeople from Quimper
French footballers
Footballers from Brittany
Association football midfielders
Championnat National players
Championnat National 2 players
Championnat National 3 players
Rangers F.C. players
AFC Compiègne players
Vendée Poiré-sur-Vie Football players
La Roche VF players
French expatriate footballers
French expatriate sportspeople in Scotland
Expatriate footballers in Scotland